The Big Bogan is a statue in Nyngan, New South Wales, Australia. Nyngan is in Bogan Shire; the proposal to erect a statue of a "bogan" had a mixed reception. The statue was erected on 9 September 2015.

The statue has continued to cause some controversy.

The St. Mark's Anglican Church Minister came up with the idea of erecting a big sculpture that will draw tourists to Nyngan. The Bogan Shire Council began the process in March 2015 and the design of the statue was created digitally and provided to a local steel supplier to make a cut-out. The final product was 5.96 m tall and weighed close to 1500 Kg.

In 2022, a pet dog was added to the sculpture.

References

External links
 

Big things in New South Wales
Cultural infrastructure completed in 2015
Working-class culture
2015 establishments in Australia